Frank Wood may refer to:

Frank Wood (Iowa politician) (born 1951), Iowa state senator
Frank Porter Wood (1882–1955), Canadian art collector
Frank Wood (actor) (born 1960), American actor
Frank W. Wood (1862–1953), Royal Navy officer and watercolorist
Frank Bradshaw Wood (1915–1997), American astronomer,
Frank E. Wood (1891–1972), American football coach and mathematics professor
Frank C. Wood, American lawyer and politician from New York

See also
Francis Wood (disambiguation)
Frank Woods (disambiguation)
Frank Woodley (born 1968), Australian comedian